Mount Ashigara (足柄山), also known as Mount Kintoki (金時山), is the northernmost peak of the Hakone caldera, on the border of Kanagawa and Shizuoka prefectures, in the Fuji-Hakone-Izu National Park in Japan. Ashigara is not a remnant of the collapse of the old Hakone volcano itself, but rather a parasitic cone growing from its flank. 

Mount Ashigara is the legendary birthplace of Kintarō.

Etymology
The kanji of the mountain's name mean "Leg Handle Mountain", but the written form is ateji, meaning that the kanji were applied phonetically, and not for any symbolic representation of the mountain's characteristics or history.  In old songs it is spelled out phonetically as asigari (阿之賀利) or asigara (安思我良).

Access
Hakone side
 90 minutes' walk from Sengoku bus stop
Gotemba side
 120 minutes' walk from Otome Toge bus stop
Minami Ashigara side
 90 minutes' walk from Ashigara Pass
 120 minutes' walk from Jizodo bus stop

See also
Kintoki
Ashigara Pass

Ashigara
Parasitic cones